Legend is the eighth album released by American rapper MC Lyte. The album was released in 2015 via Omnivore Recordings and its global entertainment firm, Sunni Gyrl, and featured production from Dominique Ludarius Cohill, Emmanuel A. Jimenez, Emmanuel Wells II, Loudbox and Olson Kenneth Wells II.

The album features collaborations with artists such as Coko from SWV, Common, Faith Evans, Kenny Lattimore, Lil' Mama and the winner of the reality TV show High School Musical: Get in the Picture Stan Carrizosa.

As part of Record Store Day (April 18), the album was available for 24 hours only on a limited-edition vinyl collector's item.

Background
Although in 2008 Lyte had released an EP as part of Almost September, Legend would be her first solo studio album since Da Undaground Heat, Vol. 1, released 12 years earlier. The album features collaborations with artists such as Coko from SWV, Common, Faith Evans, Kenny Lattimore, Lil' Mama and the winner of the reality TV show High School Musical: Get in the Picture Stan Carrizosa.

In a Rolling Out interview, Lyte would comment on the "Legend" production "I think it’s very timely in terms of the production. I was able to add a new and true style. New because we have songs like “Check” and “We Here Now,” that sort of encompass the sound that is so popular today. We were also able to capture what I call the true sound, which is organic instrumentation, things that people are accustomed to hearing my songs like “Dear John” and “Last Time.” Those are the songs that are able to capture that sound. It’s just true to my style, I may not be addressing a specific topic song by song, but I am telling you who I am. I am standing for what it is I believe, and hopefully, I’m able to talk to my fans and also to the newcomers to hip-hop and show them a glimpse of who MC Lyte is." The production of some songs would be in charge of the native production team of California, Loudbox Entertainment, of which Lyte would comment "Eighty percent of them come from a church background, so they play all instruments. They really have a sense of music, which I really enjoy."

When asked by The Source about her motivation to record an album, Lyte would respond:

Release and promotion
On June 7, 2013, the single "Cravin'" was released in digital format, in which Lyte collaborates with singer Stan Carrizosa. This song would later be included on the album. In October of that same year she and Carrizosa performed the song at the Arsenio Hall Show.

In September 2014 the second single "Dear John" was released. The track, which features Common and 10Beats, is an open letter to men. The single appeared on the real-time US Billboard + Twitter Trending 140, where it peaked  3. On October 14, 2014, MC Lyte performed "Dear John" in front of President Barack Obama, at the celebration of the 50th anniversary of the legislation that created the National Endowment for the Humanities and the National Endowment for the Arts.

A few months later the third single, "Ball", was released. The song, which features rapper Lil Mama and singer AV, was performed on the Fox talk show The Real. Ball also has had a music video directed by Ron Yuan, who previously had also directed the video for "Cravin'".

In April 2015, shortly before the album's release, the fourth and final single "Check" was released. The song also has a music video, which also serves as a lyrical visual, combining some footage from Lyte's live presentations. As part of Record Store Day (April 18), the album was available for 24 hours only on a limited-edition vinyl collector's item. The promotion was to support independent record stores nationwide.

Track listing 
The information are taken from the liner notes and the official page of the ASCAP.

Personnel
Production

 Dominique Ludarius Cohill
 Emmanuel A. Jimenez
 Emmanuel Wells II
 Loudbox
 Olson Kenneth Wells II
 The Natives
 José Guzmán
 Douglas Williams

References

External links
LEGEND THE ALBUM at MC Lyte Now
MC Lyte — Legend at Omnivore Recordings official page

 

2015 albums
MC Lyte albums
Omnivore Recordings albums